is a village located on Amami Ōshima, in Ōshima District, Kagoshima Prefecture, Japan.

As of June 2013, the village had an estimated population of 1,843 and a population density of 17.9 persons per km2. The total area was 103.07 km2.

Geography
Uken occupies the southern portion of the west coast of Amami Ōshima, facing the East China Sea. The climate is classified as humid subtropical (Köppen climate classification Cfa) with very warm summers and mild winters. Precipitation is high throughout the year, but is highest in the months of May, June and September. The area is subject to frequent typhoons.

Surrounding municipalities
Amami
Yamato
Setouchi

History
Yakiuchi Village was established on April 1, 1908. It became Uken Village on November 1, 1917. Many inhabitants of the village emigrated to Brazil before World War II. As with all of the Amami Islands, the village came under the administration of the United States from July 1, 1946 to December 25, 1953.  Efforts to merge the village with neighboring municipalities collapsed in 2005. In 2006, the village government expressed an interest to be considered as a potential location for the disposal of high level radioactive wastes to the Nuclear Waste Management Organization of Japan, much to the outrage of many inhabitants.

References

External links

  

Villages in Kagoshima Prefecture
Populated coastal places in Japan